St Anne's was a Roman Catholic church in Laxton Place near Regent's Park in London. The church was constructed in 1970 but fell into disuse at the turn of the 21st century and was demolished in 2019 to make way for flats.

History
There had been a school chapel in Little Albany Street since 1857, replaced in 1938 by a new church in Seaton Place. The redevelopment of the area in the 1960s included provision for a new church on the corner of Laxton Place and Longford Street. Cardinal Heenan laid the foundation stone on 30 May 1970 and the church opened later that year.

The UK's small Chaldean community started worshipping in the church in 1991 under the Right Rev Andreas Abouna. Worship continued until at least 2003, but the church had closed by 2011. It has since been demolished.

Architecture
The church was designed by Scott and Jaques. It has curving walls of dark brick, broken up by 17 tall windows. Trusses of prestressed concrete support a copper roof. The altar is stone, but the rest of the furnishings are wooden.

Future
In 2011, the Roman Catholic Church proposed that St Anne's be used as the principal church of the Personal Ordinariate of Our Lady of Walsingham for former Anglicans. Damian Thompson, the religious affairs commentator for The Daily Telegraph and a prominent supporter of the ordinariate, has rejected this proposal and has described St Anne's as a "cross between a public lavatory and a Christian Science Reading Room". Thompson preferred that St Etheldreda's Church in Ely Place, the only medieval Roman Catholic church in London, to be used by the ordinariate.

See also
 Regent's Park Estate – council estate to the north
 Regent's Place – new development on other side of Longford St

References

External links
 St Anne's Church webpage

Roman Catholic churches in the London Borough of Camden
Roman Catholic churches completed in 1970
20th-century Roman Catholic church buildings in the United Kingdom